James Benning (born 1942) is an American independent filmmaker and educator. Over the course of his 40-year career Benning has made over twenty-five feature-length films that have shown in many different venues across the world. Since 1987, he has taught at California Institute of the Arts (CalArts). He is known as a minimalist filmmaker.

Early life and education 
James Benning was born 1942 in Milwaukee, Wisconsin. Benning played baseball for the first twenty years of his life. He earned an undergraduate and master's degree in mathematics at the University of Wisconsin–Milwaukee, which he attended on a baseball scholarship. Benning experienced a political awakening and racial consciousness during the late 1960s, participating in civil rights protests led by Father James Groppi in segregated Milwaukee.

Benning dropped out of graduate school to forfeit his military deferment since his friends, who were mostly not in school, were being drafted and dying in Vietnam. Benning instead joined the War on Poverty, teaching children of migrant workers in Colorado how to read and write, and helping to start a commodities food program that fed people living in poverty in the Missouri Ozarks. Benning often uses this background as part of his film work.

At the age of 33, Benning received an MFA from the University of Wisconsin–Madison where he had studied with David Bordwell.

For the next four years he taught filmmaking at Northwestern University and CalArts.

Film 
Benning was hailed cinema's voice of the Midwest with his 1976/1978 films, 11 x 14 and One Way Boogie Woogie, made in Chicago and Milwaukee and the surrounding rural region. In 1980, Benning moved to lower Manhattan, where, with the aid of grants and funding from German Television, he continued to make films, most notably, American Dreams (1984) and Landscape Suicide (1986). Leaving New York after eight years, Benning moved west to teach film/video at California Institute of the Arts, and has taught there ever since. In the early 1990s Benning made a series of text/image films: North on Evers (1991), Deseret (1995), Four Corners (1997), and UTOPIA (1998), often invoking histories of how antagonistic cultural and economic agendas over land use shape landscapes and configure social environments.

Benning has employed diverse methods, themes, structures, and aesthetics, investigating narrative and anti-narrative modes, personal history, race, collective memory, place, industry, and landscape. His philosophy of "landscape as a function of time," and "Looking and Listening" (which is also the name of a course taught by Benning) is particularly evident in his films since 1999 in the form of fixed, stable shots. For instance, each of El Valley Centro, Los, and Sogobi—The California Trilogy (2000-2001) is composed of 35 2½ minute shots. Nightfall (2012) consists of a single 98-minute shot made at a high elevation in the woods in the west Sierras that begins in late afternoon as the sun is going down and ends in near blackness.

Benning's use of duration reflects his accord with Henry David Thoreau's passage from Walden, "No method nor discipline can supersede the necessity of being forever on the alert. What is a course of history, or philosophy, or poetry, no matter how well selected, or the best society, or the most admirable routine of life, compared with the discipline of looking at what is to be seen?"

Benning divides his time between Val Verde, California, and a small town in the Sierra Nevada north of Bakersfield. There, in 2007, Benning built a replica of the cabin Thoreau constructed in 1845 on Walden Pond. The following year Benning erected a copy of the cabin Ted Kaczynski built in 1971 in Montana. Inside the cabins Benning has installed a number of copies he made of paintings by artists that have deeply inspired him, including Bill Traylor, Henry Darger, and Mose Tolliver. These locations are near to California Institute of the Arts where he is teaching in the film department.

Publication 
Benning published a book of poems titled Thirty Years to Life in 1973, and Fifty Years to Life, Texts from Eight Films by James Benning in 2000, both with Two Pants Press in Madison, Wisconsin. Reinhard Wulf's feature-length documentary, James Benning: Circling the Image, was released in 2003. In 2007, the Austrian Film Museum also published the first substantial monograph on the filmmaker, James Benning, edited by Barbara Pichler and Claudia Slanar. In 2011, Julie Ault (ed.) collaborated with Benning on the book (FC) Two Cabins by JB, published with A.R.T. Press. Scores of reviews, articles, and essays on Benning's work, as well as interviews with the filmmaker have appeared in publications worldwide.

Medium 
Benning worked exclusively in 16mm until the increasing obsolescence of the medium necessitated he convert to digital. His first digital film was Ruhr (2009), commissioned by Werner Ruzicka for the Duisburger Filmwoche. Digital filmmaking allowed him to branch out in different directions including re-makes of Faces (2011) and Easy Rider (2012), as well as the two-hour one shot film Nightfall (2011). Benning's work has always traversed the film sphere and the art field, finding constituencies in both. He made 16mm installations at Art Park (1977), the Walker Art Center (1978), and the Whitney Museum of American Art (1980), and has recently created digital installations at Las Cienegas Projects, Los Angeles, (2011), 21er Haus, Museum of Contemporary Art, Vienna (2012), and Argos, Centrum Voor Kunst en Media, Brussels (2012).

Distribution 
Benning is represented by neugerriemschneider, Berlin. He continues to distribute his own films, as he has for his entire career. Benning has been supported by grants from the Rockefeller Foundation, the National Endowment for the Arts, the Guggenheim Foundation, the American Film Institute, New York State Council on the Arts, the Wisconsin Arts Board, and the University Film Association. From the mid-1990s to the mid-2000s Werner Deutsch and Cologne-based WDR-TV supported Benning's work with commissions and the purchase of broadcast rights. The Austrian Film Museum in Vienna is restoring and archiving all of Benning's 16mm films as well as, over time, producing DVDs of the works.  The Academy Film Archive, in conjunction with the Austrian Film Museum, preserved Benning's film Chicago Loop in 2013.

Filmography

Personal life 
James Benning's only child is the artist Sadie Benning, born in 1973.

References

Further publications 
 Barbara Pichler, Claudia Slanar (Ed.): James Benning. FilmmuseumSynemaPublikationen Vol. 6, Vienna 2007, .
 James Benning, American Dreams / Landscape Suicide, Edition Filmmuseum, 2-disc set, 2011 Österreichisches Filmmuseum
 James Benning, casting a glance / RR, Edition Filmmuseum, 2-disc set, 2012, Österreichisches Filmmuseum
 James Benning, California Trilogy, Edition Filmmuseum, 2-disc set, 2012, Österreichisches Filmmuseum
 James Benning, Deseret / Four Corners, Edition Filmmuseum, 2-disc set, 2013, Österreichisches Filmmuseum
 James Benning, natural history / Ruhr, Edition Filmmuseum, 2-disc set, 2014, Österreichisches Filmmuseum
 James Benning, 11x14 / One Way Boogie Woogie/27 Years Later, Edition Filmmuseum, 2-disc set, 2018, Österreichisches Filmmuseum
 James Benning, Grand Opera. An Historical Romance / O Panama, Edition Filmmuseum, 2021, Österreichisches Filmmuseum

See also
Slow cinema
Slow movement
Art film

American experimental filmmakers
1942 births
Living people
University of Wisconsin–Madison College of Letters and Science alumni
Filmmakers from Milwaukee
Bard College faculty
Place of birth missing (living people)
Northwestern University faculty
California Institute of the Arts faculty
People from Chicago
Film directors from Illinois